Mellerud Municipality (Melleruds kommun) is a municipality in Västra Götaland County by Lake Vänern in Sweden. Its seat is located in the town of Mellerud.

The amalgamation leading to the present municipality took place in 1969 when "old" Mellerud (instituted as a market town (köping) in 1908) was merged with Bolstad, Kroppefjäll and Skållerud. Before the municipal reform of 1952 there were ten entities in the area.

Localities
Population figures from Statistics Sweden as of December 31, 2005.

Mellerud, 3,796
Dals Rostock, 885
Åsensbruk, 530
Bränna, 228
Dalskog, 151
Håverud, 150
Köpmannebro, 76
Erikstad, 58

References

External links

Mellerud Municipality - Official site
The local newspaper - (TTELA)

Municipalities of Västra Götaland County
North Älvsborg